Diuris pedunculata, commonly known as the small snake orchid, is a species of orchid which is endemic to New South Wales. It usually has two leaves at its base and one or two yellow and orange flowers with purple markings. It originally occurred in scattered populations between Tenterfield and the Hawkesbury River but because of habitat loss is now only known from the New England Tableland.

Description
Flowering occurs in August and September.

Taxonomy and naming
Diuris pedunculata was first described in 1810 by Robert Brown and the description was published in his Prodromus Florae Novae Hollandiae et Insulae Van Diemen. The specific epithet (pedunculata) is a Latin word meaning "small, slender stalk".

Distribution and habitat
The small snake orchid was originally found in scattered populations between Tenterfield and the Hawkesbury River but is now only known mostly from areas around Armidale, Uralla, Guyra and Ebor. It grows in moist, grassy places and in open forest.

Similar orchids occurring in south-east New South Wales, the Australian Capital Territory, Victoria and Tasmania have been reinterpreted as Diuris subalpina.

Ecology
This orchid appears use sexual deception, attracting mostly males of the native bee species, Halictus lanuginosus for pollination, even though the flowers produce nectar and emit a strong scent that attract other insects.

Conservation status
Diuris pedunculata is listed as "endangered" under the Australian Government Environment Protection and Biodiversity Conservation Act 1999 and under the New South Wales Biodiversity Conservation Act 2016. The main threats to the species include habitat loss and fragmentation, grazing and trampling by livestock, weed invasion and the activities of feral pigs.

References

pedunculata
Endemic orchids of Australia
Orchids of New South Wales
Plants described in 1810
Endemic flora of Western Australia